Olšany is a municipality and village in Šumperk District in the Olomouc Region of the Czech Republic. It has about 1,000 inhabitants.

Administrative parts
The village of Klášterec is an administrative part of Olšany.

Geography
The municipal territory extends into three geomorphological regions: the western part lies in the Zábřeh Highlands, the middle part lies in the Mohlenice Depression, and a small part in the north lies in the Hanušovice Highlands.

The village lies in a valley on the right bank of the Morava River. The Bušínský and Kamenný creeks flow through the municipality.

History
The first mention of Olšany comes from 1386 referring about a local landowner Bolík of Olšany. Klášterec was first mentioned in 1349.

A place situated in the northern part of Olšany was historically separated village Doubravice. Doubravice was bought by Ruda nad Moravou administrator in the early 17th century, who moved inhabitants out and established a farm in the place.

A factory producing cigarette paper was established in 1862 and significantly changed the municipality's rural character and also caused steep growth of population.

In 1980, Klášterec was joined to Olšany.

Economy
The cigarette paper factory is still in operation and is the main employer in Olšany. Its products are known under the brand Vážka.

Transport
Olšany lies along the road leading from Šumperk to Červená Voda.

Sport
There is a small ski resort with two ski lifts.

Notable people
Hans Nibel (1880–1934), German mechanical engineer

References

External links

Villages in Šumperk District